The Golden Reel Award for Outstanding Achievement in Sound Editing – Series 1 Hour – Dialogue/ADR is an annual award given by the Motion Picture Sound Editors. It honors sound editors whose work has warranted merit in the field of television; in this case, their work in the field of automated dialogue replacement, or ADR in long form broadcast media. The "long form" of the title refers to television episodes that have a runtime of more than one hour. It was first awarded in 2002, for episodes premiering the previous year, under the title Best Sound Editing in Television – Dialogue & ADR, Long Form. The term "long form" was added to the category in 2002, as long form television had been award under the category titled Best Sound Editing – Television Movies and Specials – Dialogue & ADR, or some moniker of it, since 1997. The award has been given with its current title since 2022.

Winners and nominees

1990s

2000s

2010s

2020s

Programs with multiple nominations

3 nominations
 The Handmaid's Tale (Hulu)
 Ozark (Netflix)
 Westworld (HBO)

2 nominations
 Better Call Saul (AMC)
 The Crown (Netflix)
 Game of Thrones (HBO)
 Succession (HBO)
 The Walking Dead (AMC)

See also

 List of American television awards

References

American television awards
Golden Reel Awards (Motion Picture Sound Editors)